Indivisible may refer to:

Mathematics
Method of indivisibles, the historical name of what is now known as Cavalieri's principle
Absence of divisibility (ring theory)

Arts

Films
Indivisible (2016 film), a 2016 Italian film
Indivisible (2018 film), a 2018 American film

Music
Indivisible, album by Lungfish (band) 1997
"Indivisible", song by Marie-Mai
"Indivisible", song by Pillar from Fireproof (Pillar album)
"Indivisible", song by Hatebreed
"Indivisible", song by Lungfish (band)
"Indivisible", song by The Dirtbombs
"Indivisible", song by Plankeye
"Indivisible", song by Crüxshadows
"Indivisible", song by Betty Wright
"Indivisible", song by Yellowjackets

Other media
Indivisible, a novel by Fanny Howe (2003)
Indivisible (video game)

Other uses
French ship Indivisible (1799)
Indivisible movement, a progressive movement initiated as a reaction to the election of Donald Trump as US President in 2016